Sacha Fernand Henri Opinel (born 9 April 1977) is a French former professional footballer who played as a defender. He made over 200 appearances in the French Ligue, the Scottish League, the English Football League and the English Football Conference, and won an FA Trophy winners' medal in 2008.

Career
Opinel, who is a cousin of Eric Cantona, began his career with French clubs Cannes, Lille and Ajaccio before joining Scottish club Raith Rovers in December 1999, where he made over 20 league and cup appearances. He was released by Rovers in December 2000 by mutual consent after a series of on and off-the-field problems. After training with Third Division club, Plymouth Argyle, Opinel was given a short-term contract so that manager Paul Sturrock could take a closer look at him over the 2000 Christmas and New Year period. He made only one appearance for Plymouth in a Football League Trophy tie against Bristol Rovers and was not offered a contract. After a trial at AFC Bournemouth, he joined Leyton Orient in February 2001, where he made eleven appearances in the remainder of the 2000–01 season, scoring one goal against Cardiff City, and helped Orient towards the Third Division play-offs in May 2001.

Opinel then dropped into non-league football, joining Billericay Town at the beginning of the 2001–02 season. He joined Farnborough Town in July 2003, signing a two-year contract in May 2004, but requested a transfer for personal and professional reasons and joined Crawley Town in January 2005 in a deal that saw Farnborough receive a substantial transfer fee as well as having Robert Traynor move from Crawley to Farnborough. Opinel had started over 50 games for Farnborough. Opinel agreed a contract until May 2006 with Crawley and in July 2006, he joined Gravesend & Northfleet (now Ebbsfleet United). He signed a new contract in May 2007 and collected a winners' medal when Ebbsfleet won the FA Trophy at Wembley Stadium in May 2008. On 4 June 2009, Opinel re-joined Farnborough.

Honours
Ebbsfleet United
FA Trophy: 2008

References

External links

Profile on Ebbsfleet United website

1977 births
Living people
Sportspeople from Savoie
French footballers
Association football defenders
AS Cannes players
Lille OSC players
AC Ajaccio players
Raith Rovers F.C. players
Plymouth Argyle F.C. players
Leyton Orient F.C. players
Farnborough F.C. players
Crawley Town F.C. players
Ebbsfleet United F.C. players
Burgess Hill Town F.C. players
Harlow Town F.C. players
Eastbourne Borough F.C. players
Billericay Town F.C. players
Championnat National 2 players
Ligue 2 players
Scottish Football League players
English Football League players
National League (English football) players
French expatriate footballers
French expatriate sportspeople in England
French expatriate sportspeople in Scotland
Expatriate footballers in England
Expatriate footballers in Scotland
Footballers from Auvergne-Rhône-Alpes